Chad competed at the 2018 Summer Youth Olympics in Buenos Aires, Argentina from 6 October to 18 October 2018.

Competitors

Judo

Chad qualified one competitor for judo at the games. 

Individual

Team

Taekwondo

Chad qualified one athlete for taekwondo at the games.

References

You
Nations at the 2018 Summer Youth Olympics
Chad at the Youth Olympics